The YikeBike mini-farthing is a type of folding electric motorbike released on 2 September 2009 at Eurobike, going into production mid 2010. It weighs  and when folded, it is small enough to fit in a carry bag, so it can be transported in an urban bus. The YikeBike was invented by Grant Ryan and designed by a team in New Zealand over 5 years.

Characteristics
The YikeBike looks like a mini version of a penny farthing (mini-farthing).

The vehicle has no chain, pedals, gear box, mechanical brake, cables or levers. These functions are provided by a  electric motor and controller. The YikeBike has regenerative electronic anti-skid brakes. There are also built-in lights, indicators and horn for safety.

Media appearances
In September 2009, YikeBike was launched at Eurobike in Germany.

YikeBike was ranked 15th on Time magazine's 50 Best Inventions of 2009 list.

YikeBike featured on Discovery Channel's Daily Planet show.

YikeBike featured on A&E's Storage Wars. A yikebike was found in a storage locker in Season 4's Episode 2 (Series show #74, The Young and the Restless).

Stephen Fry tested the YikeBike in season 1, episode 1 of Stephen Fry's 100 Greatest Gadgets

Specifications
Original model / Fusion

See also
Electric motorcycles

References

External links
Official Website

Electric concept cars
Bicycles
New Zealand design